Folgore da San Gimignano , pseudonym of Giacomo di Michele or Jacopo di Michele (c. 1270 – c. 1332) was an Italian poet.

He represented mostly hunting scenes, jousts of the citadine bourgeoisie of Tuscany. 32 sonnets are attributed to him, written around 1308-1316. The most famous ones are the corone dedicated to the days of the week and the months. The language is Tuscan, the poetic form a derivation of the Provençal then ruling in Italian poetry. Others had an anti-Ghibelline satirical tone.

His corone were later satirized by Cenne della Chitarra.

Little more is known about his life: he is cited in a document in 1295 and other sources date his death to 1332.

Cultural references
 Two of his sonnets, April and May, were set to music in Primavera che non vi rincresca, a composition written in 1971 by Italian composer Lorenzo Ferrero.
 Both Folgore and Cenne are mentioned in Francesco Guccini's "Canzone dei dodici mesi" ("Song of the Twelve Months"), from the album Radici (1972).

References

1270 births
1332 deaths
Italian poets
Italian male poets